Karachayevsky District (Qaraçay rayon) is an administrative and a municipal district (raion), one of the ten in the Karachay-Cherkess Republic, Russia. It is located in the central and southern parts of the republic. Its administrative center is the town of Karachayevsk (which is not administratively a part of the district). As of 2010 Census, the total population of the district was 30,376.

Administrative and municipal status
Within the framework of administrative divisions, Karachayevsky District is one of the ten in the Karachay-Cherkess Republic and has administrative jurisdiction over two urban-type settlements (Novy Karachay and Pravokubansky) and seventeen rural localities. The town of Karachayevsk serves as its administrative center, despite being incorporated separately as a town of republic significance—an administrative unit with the status equal to that of the districts.

As a municipal division, the district is incorporated as Karachayevsky Municipal District. The two urban-type settlements are incorporated into two urban settlements, while the seventeen rural localities are incorporated into thirteen rural settlements within the municipal district. The town of republic significance of Karachayevsk is incorporated separately from the district as Karachayevsky Urban Okrug, but serves as the administrative center of the municipal district as well.

References

Notes

Sources

Districts of Karachay-Cherkessia
